Maeve Christina Mary Sherlock, Baroness Sherlock,  (born 10 November 1960) is a Labour Party life peer.

Biography
Born in Finsbury Park, north London, Sherlock was educated at Our Lady's Abingdon in Abingdon on Thames before going on to study Sociology at Liverpool University.  She later received an MBA from the Open University. She served as NUS President from 1988 to 1990.

From 2007 to 2010 she was a commissioner of the Equality and Human Rights Commission (EHRC). Sherlock chaired the National Student Forum from 2007 to 2010 and was a Non-Executive Director of the Child Maintenance and Enforcement Commission from 2008 to 2010.  She has been on the board of the Financial Ombudsman Service since 2007.

She was chief executive of the Refugee Council, a charity supporting refugees and asylum seekers in the UK, between August 2003 and October 2006. Prior to joining the charity, she worked as a special advisor to the Chancellor of the Exchequer, Gordon Brown MP. At the Treasury her brief covered social issues such as child poverty and welfare reform.

Sherlock has also been Chief Executive of the National Council for One Parent Families, Director of the education charity UKCOSA and is a former president of the National Union of Students. She was a trustee of the think tank Demos. She studied at the University of Liverpool in the 1980s. She is currently working on her doctorate in Theology at St Chad's College, Durham University, of which she is also an Honorary Fellow and Tutor.

Church of England
Sherlock trained for ordained ministry at St Mellitus College from 2016 to 2018. On 30 June 2018, she was ordained as a deacon in the Church of England, to serve her curacy at St Nicholas' Church, Durham (St Nics). On 29 June 2019, she was ordained a priest at Durham Cathedral. In May 2022, she was licensed as non-stipendiary associate vicar of St Nics. Since 2022, she has also been a priest vicar of Westminster Abbey.

Honours
She was appointed an Officer of the Order of the British Empire (OBE) in the 2000 New Year Honours.

On 17 June 2010, she was created a life peer as Baroness Sherlock, of Durham in the County of Durham, and was introduced in the House of Lords on 5 July 2010.

References

1960 births
Alumni of the University of Liverpool
British people of Irish descent
Living people
Labour Party (UK) life peers
Life peeresses created by Elizabeth II
Officers of the Order of the British Empire
Alumni of St Chad's College, Durham
People from Durham, England
Presidents of the National Union of Students (United Kingdom)
Staff of St Chad's College, Durham